Kristian Cato Walby Kjelling (born 8 September 1980) is a retired Norwegian handball player, who last played for the Norwegian club Drammen HK. He is now their coach.

Career
Before re-joining Drammen HK he played for the Spanish clubs Portland San Antonio and Ademar León and the Danish clubs AaB Håndbold and Bjerringbro-Silkeborg and the Norwegian clubs Kjelsås, Vestli, and Drammen.

Kjelling won King’s cup in 2002 and the EHF Cup-Winners Cup in 2004/2005 with Ademar Leon.

References

External links
Profile on Dagbladet.no

1980 births
Living people
Norwegian male handball players
Expatriate handball players
Norwegian expatriate sportspeople in Denmark
Norwegian expatriate sportspeople in Spain
SDC San Antonio players
Liga ASOBAL players
CB Ademar León players
Aalborg Håndbold players
Handball players from Oslo